1960 in philosophy

Events 
 British Society of Aesthetics was founded in 1960.
 Dutch mathematician Hans Freudenthal invents the artificial language Lincos, intended for communication with extraterrestrial intelligence.

Publications 
 Elias Canetti, Crowds and Power
 Hans-Georg Gadamer, Truth and Method

Philosophical fiction 
 Raja Rao, The Serpent and the Rope

Births 
 February 27 - Simon Critchley, English philosopher
 June 25 - Vittorio Hösle, Italian-born German philosopher

Deaths 
Birth years link to the corresponding "[year] in philosophy" article:
 January 4 - Albert Camus, French author and philosopher (born 1913) (automobile accident)
 February 8 - J. L. Austin, English philosopher of language (born 1911) (lung cancer)

References 

Philosophy
20th-century philosophy
Philosophy by year